is a Japanese male curler.

At the national level, he is a three-time Japan men's champion curler (2001, 2002, 2003).

Teams

References

External links

Living people
1981 births
Japanese male curlers
Pacific-Asian curling champions
Japanese curling champions
Asian Games medalists in curling
Curlers at the 2003 Asian Winter Games
Curlers at the 2007 Asian Winter Games
Medalists at the 2003 Asian Winter Games
Medalists at the 2007 Asian Winter Games
Asian Games silver medalists for Japan
Place of birth missing (living people)